The Garland County Courthouse is located at the corner of Ouachita and Hawthorne Streets in Hot Springs, the county seat of Garland County, Arkansas.  It is a rectangular four-story brick structure with Classical Revival styling.  It has projecting entry sections on the north and south sides, with stylistically sympathetic additions to the south and west.  It was built in 1905, gutted by a major fire in 1913, after which its interior was rebuilt.  In a statewide survey of county courthouses conducted in 1979, it was judged to be one of the state's most architecturally significant courthouse buildings.

The courthouse was listed on the National Register of Historic Places in 1979.

See also

National Register of Historic Places listings in Garland County, Arkansas

References

Courthouses on the National Register of Historic Places in Arkansas
Neoclassical architecture in Arkansas
Government buildings completed in 1905
Buildings and structures in Hot Springs, Arkansas
National Register of Historic Places in Hot Springs, Arkansas
1905 establishments in Arkansas